The 1998 Broadland District Council election took place on 7 May 1998 to elect members of Broadland District Council in England. This was on the same day as other local elections.

Election result

References

1998 English local elections
May 1998 events in the United Kingdom
1998
1990s in Norfolk